This is an incomplete list of compositions by the Ukrainian composer Borys Lyatoshynsky.

Lyatoshynsky wrote a variety of works, including five symphonies, symphonic poems, and several shorter orchestral and vocal works, two operas, chamber music, and a number of works for solo piano. He wrote music with a modern European style and technique, skilfully combining it with Ukrainian folk music themes. His musical style later developed in a direction favoured by the Russian composer Dmitri Shostakovich, which caused significant problems with Soviet critics of the time, and as a result Lyatoshynsky was accused of formalism and the creation of degenerative art. 

Liatoshynsky’s main works are his operas The Golden Ring and Shchors, the five symphonies, the Overture on Four Ukrainian Folk Themes (1926), the suites Taras Shevchenko (1952) and Romeo and Juliet (1955), the symphonic poem Grazhyna (1955), his "Slavic" concerto for piano and orchestra (1953), and the completion and orchestration of Reinhold Glière’s violin concerto (1956).  He composed film scores for such films as  (1931), Ivan (1932, with Yuliy Meitus), Taras Shevchenko (1951),  (1956, with Mykola Kolessa), and  (1959). Many of his compositions were rarely or never performed during his lifetime.

List of works by genre

Orchestral

Transcriptions
 Lysenko's opera Taras Bulba (with L. Revutsky) 
 Lysenko's opera Aeneid.
 Gliere's Violin Concerto (with K. G. Mostras)
 Gliere's Comedians
 Gliere's Shah-Senem
 Gliere's ballet Red Poppy

Chamber

Solo piano

Choral/vocal

Song cycles without an opus number

 Songs after Shevchenko (including “Water flows into the blue sea”; 2 "The sun rises from behind the grove"). 19491951.
 Two songs ("When the well shakes"; "How will you hear at night"). Lyrics by Franko.
 Songs to texts by Shevchenko	(1 "A banner behind a banner"); 2 "On the Dnieper Saga").	1960.
 Two Ukrainian folk songs	(“Oh, a quiet wind is blowing in the field”); “Oh, a long time ago”.	1934.
 Songs for mixed choir accompanied by piano (1 "Thought about the Cossack Sophron");  2 "About Karmelyuka"). 1932.

Individual songs with no opus number

 “Airship”.	
 "And in those small houses".
 "Bygone days”. 1931. Romance after Shelley.
 “Haze”.	19191920. From a text by Balmont; also set in Russian.
 "Heart of the Kobzar".
 “In the album of Caroline Janisz”.
 “I walked in the crossroads”.
 "I was a guest in your heart" . 1924.
 "Oh, if my heart is cold". 1924. Words by Balmont.
 “Sum of spring” (19191920). Весна грустит  Vesna grustit 
 "Terrible is the cold of the evenings". 1926.
 	Testament. 1939. Cantata after Shevtchenko.
 “The grove turns green again”. 19221924.
 "The heart of the Kobzar". 1964.
 "The monk's mountain". 1964.
“There are brown eyes”. 1927.	Text by Shevchenko.
 “The silence and fragrance of sleeping flowers”. 1922.
 "The sorrow of spring" . 19191920.
 “The sun”. Words by Lermontov.

 "Creeping, periwinkle".()
 "Glorious Way". 1939
 “My dreams fade in solitude”
 “Old and young”.
 "Our comrade-in-arms fell under the birch". 1950. Lyrics by Anatoly Sofronov.
 "Silence, the fragrance of dormant flowers".
 "The moon creeps across the sky".
 "The sun rises over Siberia".
 "The sun rises at the horizon", after Shevtshenko.
 “Yesterday was Saturday night”.

Wind band
 Solemn March of the #99 Rifle Division
 March No 2 for wind orchestra (1932)
 March No 3 for wind orchestra (1936)

Notes

References

Sources

Further reading

External links
 
 Biography and list of works by Lyatoshynsky from Notes on Ukrainian Composers (in Ukrainian)
 Works by Lyatoshynsky in the German National Library catalogue (in German)

Lyatoshynsky, Borys